This is a list of notable people from the Goryeo dynasty, a period in Korean history lasting from 918 to 1392.

Rulers
For a chronological list of rulers, see List of Korean monarchs

King Taejo (918–943)
King Hyejong (943–945)
King Jeongjong (945–949)
King Gwangjong (949–975)
King Gyeongjong (975–981)
King Seongjong (981–997)
King Mokjong (997–1009)
King Hyeonjong (1009–1031)
King Deokjong (1031–1034)
King Jeongjong (1034–1046)
King Munjong (1046–1083)
King Sunjong (1083)
King Seonjong (1083–1094)
King Heonjong (1094–1095)
King Sukjong (1095–1105)
King Yejong (1105–1122)
King Injong (1122–1146)
King Uijong (1146–1170)
King Myeongjong (1170–1197)
King Sinjong (1197–1204)
King Huijong (1204–1211)
King Gangjong (1211–1213)
King Gojong (1213–1259)
King Wonjong (1259–1274)
King Chungnyeol (1274–1308)
King Chungseon (1308–1313)
King Chungsuk (1313–1330; 1332–1339)
King Chunghye (1330–1332; 1339–1344)
King Chungmok (1344–1348)
King Chungjeong (1348–1351)
King Gongmin (1351–1374)
King U (1374–1388)
King Chang (1388–1389)
King Gongyang (1389–1392)

Military officials
Sin Sung-gyeom, who died saving the life of Taejo.
Seo Hui
Gang Jo
Gang Gam-chan, remembered for his victories in the Third Goryeo-Khitan War.
Yoon Gwan
Jeong Jung-bu
Yi Ui-bang
Gyeong Dae-seung
Yi Ui-min
Choe Chungheon, military dictator.
Choe U, military dictator. Choe Chungheon's son.
Bae Jung-son
Kim Tong-jeong
Choe Mu-seon, scientist and military commander.
Choe Yeong, rival to Yi Seonggye in the waning days of Goryeo.
Yi Ja-chun, father of Yi Seonggye.
Yi Seonggye, who overthrew Goryeo in the late 14th century and established the Joseon Dynasty.

Scholar-officials
Yi Ja-gyeom
Kim Seon
Choe Seung-ro
Choe Chung
Kim Busik
Choe Yun-ui
An Hyang
Jeong Mong-ju
Yi Saek
Gil Jae
Jeong Do-jeon
Gwon Geun
 U Tak

Buddhist monks
Doseon
Daegak Guksa
Myo Cheong
Jinul
Il-yeon
Shin Don
Muhak

Popular leaders
Manjeok

Collaborator of Yuan
Wang Go
Wang Toghtua Bukha
Empress Gi
Hong Bok-won, a Goryeo commander who later served as an administrator of the Mongol Empire.
Gi Cheol

See also
List of Koreans
List of Baekje people
List of Silla people
List of Goguryeo people
List of Joseon Dynasty people
History of Korea

Goryeo people
Goryeo